Thomas Harold Craven (26 April 1895 – 26 November 1970) was a player for Geelong in the VFL between 1915 and 1924. He captained the club in 1921 and 1922. Despite his small size, he played most of his career at full back. He was a boundary umpire for two league games in 1931.

References

External links

1895 births
1970 deaths
Geelong Football Club players
Newtown Football Club players
Australian Football League umpires
Australian rules footballers from Geelong